"Beautiful as You" a song by Australian band,  The Whitlams. It was released in February 2007 as the lead and sole single from the band's sixth studio album, Little Cloud. The song peaked at number 40 on the ARIA Charts.

Track listings
CD single
 "Beautiful as You" – 3:20
 "Fondness Makes the Heart Grow Absent" (remix) – 4:07
 "I Was Alive" (live) – 2:51

iTunes
 "Beautiful as You" – 3:20
 "Fondness Makes the Heart Grow Absent" (remix) – 4:07
 "I Was Alive" (live) – 2:51
 "Friends" – 2:46
 "Wastin' Time" – 3:15

Charts

References

The Whitlams songs
2007 singles
Songs written by Tim Freedman
2006 songs